Laser is a brand of malt liquor manufactured by the Miller Brewing Company and Falstaff Brewing Company.  The beverage contains 5.9% alcohol by volume.  In 1997, Falstaff won a silver medal at the Great American Beer Festival for Laser Malt Liquor.

American beer brands
Falstaff Brewing Corporation brands